Carbon County is a county in the U.S. state of Utah. As of the 2010 United States Census, the population was 21,403. Its county seat and largest city is Price.

The Price, UT Micropolitan Statistical Area includes all of Carbon County.

History
Carbon County was part of Emery County, founded in 1880. The demographics along the Price River changed with the construction of the Denver and Rio Grande Western Railroad in 1883 and the development of coal mines, largely in upper Emery, to fuel the railroad. The Utah Territory Legislature was petitioned to split off the north part, and thus it established Carbon County effective March 8, 1894. It was named for the element Carbon, to emphasize the industrial nature of the area.

Carbon County is the second-largest natural gas producer in Utah (after Uintah County), with 94 billion cubic feet produced in 2008.

Geography

The Green River flows south-southeastward along the county's eastern border. The lower central part of Carbon County is a continuation of Castle Valley in Emery County, but in Carbon, the valley is ringed with mountains - the Wasatch Range to the west and northwest, and the Book Cliffs to the north and northeast. The county generally slopes to the south and east; its highest point is Monument Peak on the crest of the Wasatch Mountains near the midpoint of the county's western border, at 10,452' (3186m) ASL.

Airports
 Carbon County Regional Airport (PUC) - Price

Major highways

 U.S. Routes 6/191
 Utah State Route 10
 Utah State Route 96
 Utah State Route 122
 Utah State Route 123
 Utah State Route 124
 Utah State Route 139
 Utah State Route 157

Adjacent counties

 Utah County - northwest
 Duchesne County - north
 Uintah County - east
 Emery County - south
 Sanpete County - west

Protected areas

 Gordon Creek Wildlife Management Area
 Manti National Forest (part)
 Price Canyon Recreation Area
 Scofield State Park

Lakes
 Grassy Trail Reservoir
 Scofield Lake

Demographics

2010 census
As of the 2010 United States Census, there were 21,403 people, 7,978 households, and 5,587 families in the county. The population density was 14.48/sqmi (5.59/km2). There were 9,551 housing units, with an average density of 6.46/sqmi (2.50/km2). The racial makeup of the county was 92.31% White, 0.43% Black or African American, 1.18% Native American, 0.58% Asian, 0.01% Pacific Islander, 3.03% from other races, and 2.36% from two or more races. 12.42% of the population were Hispanic or Latino of any race.

There were 7,978 households, of which 30.16% had children under 18. 54.50% were married couples living together, 10.65% had a female householder with no husband present, and 29.97% were non-families. 25.50% of all households were made up of individuals (one person), and 11.07% had someone living alone who was 65 years of age or older. The average household size was 2.61, and the average family size was 3.14.

The population contained 30.41% under the age of 20, 6.82% aged 20 to 24, 23.73% aged 25 to 44, 25.48% aged 45 to 64, and 13.56% who were 65 years of age or older. The median age was 34.4. For every 100 females, there were 98.40 males. For every 100 females aged 18 and over, there were 96.88 males.

2015
As of 2015 the largest self-reported ancestry groups in Carbon County, Utah are:

Politics and government
Carbon County historically has been the base of Democratic Party support in strongly Republican Utah with its sizable blue-collar population. It voted for Bill Clinton in 1992 and 1996 by wide margins. In 1964 Lyndon Johnson carried 72.7% of votes in the county. At the state level, it was no less Democratic; in the 1992 gubernatorial election, it was one of two counties (the other being Summit County) that voted for Democratic candidate Stewart Hanson over Republican Michael Leavitt.

After the turn of the millennium, however, Carbon County has trended Republican. It voted for George W. Bush in 2000 and 2004 while voting for the Democratic gubernatorial candidates. In 2008, John McCain won Carbon County with 52.60% of the vote, versus 44.59% for Barack Obama. In 2012, the county's Democratic vote fell further as Mitt Romney carried 67.3% to 30.1% for Obama. In 2016, despite Utah's strong swing against the Republicans due to the presence of conservative independent Evan McMullin, Carbon County was the only county in the state to swing more Republican, as Donald Trump won 66% to Hillary Clinton's 21.5% percent. In 2020, Donald Trump again carried the county with the largest percentage (71.4%) of any Republican to date.

Notes:

Communities

Cities

 East Carbon
 Helper
 Price (county seat)
 Wellington

Town
 Scofield

Census-designated places

 Carbonville 
 Clear Creek
 Kenilworth
 Spring Glen
 West Wood

Unincorporated community
 Hiawatha

Ghost towns

 Castle Gate
 Coal City
 Consumers
 Hale
 Heiner
 Kiz
 Latuda
 Mutual
 National
 Peerless
 Rains
 Royal
 Spring Canyon
 Standardville
 Sweets (or Sweet)
 Wattis
 Winter Quarters

See also

 National Register of Historic Places listings in Carbon County, Utah

References

External links

 
 Carbon County Oral Histories

Carbon County, Utah
Populated places established in 1894
1894 establishments in Utah Territory